is a former Japanese football player.

Playing career
Okuno was born in Sakai on July 26, 1974. After graduating from high school, he joined Yokohama Flügels in 1993. He debuted and played many matches as center back in 1995. However he could hardly play in the match from 1996, he moved to Japan Football League club Omiya Ardija in 1998. Immediately he became a regular player as center back. The club was promoted to J2 League in 1999. In 2004, the club won the 2nd place and was promoted to J1 League from 2005. However his opportunity to play decreased from 2006 and he retired end of 2007 season.

Club statistics

References

External links

jsgoal

1974 births
Living people
People from Sakai, Fukui
Association football people from Fukui Prefecture
Japanese footballers
J1 League players
J2 League players
Japan Football League (1992–1998) players
Yokohama Flügels players
Omiya Ardija players
Association football defenders